Castaway on the Moon (lit. "Kim's drifting experience": 표류: drifting; hanja: 金氏漂流記) is a 2009 South Korean romantic comedy film written and directed by Lee Hae-jun. It is a love story between a suicidal man turned castaway on Bamseom in the Han River and a  Hikikomori woman who is addicted to Cyworld.

Production

Title selection
Actor Jung Jae-young suggested the director, Lee Hae-Jun, to change the name of the film to "the drifting experience of the Jungs (정씨표류기)" to reference the fact that the actor and actress playing the lead roles are part of the Jung family, but the director insisted on keeping the name since he deliberately chose the family name Kim to suggest the universal nature of the characters.

Plot development
The two Kims in the film communicate with English since the director wanted to reflect that they are different from the mainstream society that they are part of which use Korean and the isolates would have their own symbols rather than language.

Casting and Filming
Actress Jung Ryeo-won said the favorite parts of the scenario were her character's scar on her forehead since she thought she would never do such makeup ever again on her career and the theme of hope. She also addressed the challenges while playing her character in the film because she felt lonely while filming most of her scenes alone. Actor Jung Jae-young had to lose 7kgs for three months and did not trim his fingernails and toe nails and cut his hair to portray the look of a person who drifted to an uninhabited island. The film was abled to only film the beach scenes in Bamseom since it was a nature reserve and the forest scenes were filmed in Chungju and Changwon. The film was the first to film in Bamseom and the filming was specially authorized by the Seoul authorities.

Props
The character Kim Seong-geun was originally going to wear a triangle underwear but was changed to square underwear because Jung Jae-young resisted to wear it.

Marketing
Jung Jae-young had a jajangmyeon party with movie audiences on May 27, 2009 at the 63 Building.

Plot 
Kim Seong-geun (Jung Jae-young) is deep in debt and his life seems completely hopeless. He jumps off a bridge into the Han River and washes up on the shore of Bamseom, which lies directly below the bridge. After searching the island he finds it is filled mostly with vegetation and surrounded by the city, but too far to shout and he can't swim. He finds a duck-shaped paddle boat and begins to like living on the island—free of his debt and worries of city life—though it is not easy.

As he learns to survive on the island, his cry for help scrawled in the sand is seen by Kim Jung-yeon (Jung Ryeo-won), a hikikomori who spots him while engaging in her nightly habit of photographing the moon. They soon begin exchanging messages, with Jung-yeon venturing out of her house at night to throw bottled messages onto the island, and Seong-geun writing his replies in the sand. Seong-geun also manages to cultivate crops to prepare noodles for an instant noodles packet of jajangmyeon.

A torrential storm arrives, destroying Seong-geun's farm and sweeping away the possessions he has collected. He is found by a group of workers sent to clean up litter on the island and forced off. Seong-geun boards a bus in the city to jump off the 63 Building. After overcoming her anxiety and desperately running across the bridge to find Seong-geun, Jung-yeon manages to catch up to his bus after the civil defense drill stalls it. She boards and introduces herself to him.

Cast
Jung Jae-young as Kim Seong-geun
Jung Ryeo-won as Kim Jung-yeon
Park Young-seo as delivery man
Yang Mi-kyung as Jung-yeon's mother
Koo Kyo-hwan as utilities man #1
Lee Sang-il as utilities man #2
Min Kyeong-jin as apartment security guard
Jang Nam-yeol as bus driver
Lee Sang-hun as Seong-geun's father
Jang So-yeon as Seong-geun's girlfriend

Awards and nominations

Remake
In 2011, CJ Entertainment announced an American remake, with Mark Waters attached as director and Michael Goldbach as screenwriter.

Notes

References

External links 

 
 
 

 
−

2009 films
2009 romantic comedy-drama films
South Korean romantic comedy-drama films
Films set in Seoul
Films shot in Seoul
Cinema Service films
CJ Entertainment films
2000s Korean-language films
2009 comedy films
2009 drama films
2000s South Korean films